The 2018 Pittsburgh Riverhounds SC season was the club's nineteenth season of existence, and their eighth consecutive season in the United Soccer League, the second tier of American soccer. Pittsburgh also competed in the U.S. Open Cup. The season covered the period from October 15, 2017 to the beginning of the 2019 USL season.

Bob Lilley took charge of his first season as Riverhounds manager, jumping over from Rochester Rhinos after that club went on hiatus. In his 20th season as a professional manager, Lilley continued a personal record of his teams never failing to qualify for their respective playoffs.

Pittsburgh finished in third place in the Eastern Conference, the club's best regular season performance since 2010, and qualified for the playoffs for the first time in three years. The Riverhounds were eliminated in the conference quarterfinals by Bethlehem Steel FC, who prevailed after an eight-round penalty shootout. Pittsburgh won a game in the U.S. Open Cup for the first time in three years, prevailing against Erie Commodores in the second round. However, the club was knocked out in the third round by fellow USL side FC Cincinnati.

Roster

Preseason
The Riverhounds released their preseason schedule on January 29, 2018. The club played nine games in just over a month, seven coming against collegiate programs and two against fellow USL teams. All nine games were played in the state of Pennsylvania, seven at home and two on the road.

Competitions

USL

Standings

Results summary

Results by round

Match results
In August 2017, the USL announced that the 2018 season would span 34 games, the longest regular season the league had ever run. The augmented schedule was spurred by the addition of six new clubs for the 2018 season: Atlanta United 2, Fresno FC, Indy Eleven, Las Vegas Lights, Nashville SC, and North Carolina FC.

On January 12, 2018, the league announced home openers for every club. Pittsburgh began the season on the road against expansion club Nashville SC, taking part in the first match in that club's history. The Riverhounds then played their home opener against Penn FC, the first time since 2015 that Pittsburgh opened its home slate with a Keystone Derby Cup match.

The schedule for the remainder of the 2018 season was released on January 19, 2018. Pittsburgh played three times against four different clubs: Penn FC, FC Cincinnati, Indy Eleven, and Toronto FC II. They played every other Eastern Conference team twice.

Postseason

U.S. Open Cup

Statistics

Appearances and goals
Kevin Kerr entered the season among the top 10 in club history for both appearances and goals. He was third in appearances, needing to play 17 times this season to pass Gary DePalma for second all-time. He was also tied with José Angulo for sixth all-time in goals, and needed three to pass Phil Karn for fifth place in the club's history. On July 4, Kerr hit both of those marks, with the Riverhounds' victory over North Carolina FC marking his seventeenth appearance and third goal in all competitions on the year.

Disciplinary record

Clean sheets

Transfers

In

Loan in

Out

Awards

USL Team of the Week

USL Player of the Week

Postseason
USL All-League Teams
 DF Joseph Greenspan – First Team
 MF Kenardo Forbes – Second Team

Kits

See also
 2018 in American soccer
 2018 USL season

References

Pittsburgh Riverhounds SC seasons
Pittsburgh Riverhounds SC
Pittsburgh Riverhounds SC
Pittsburgh Riverhounds SC